In convex analysis, a non-negative function  is logarithmically concave (or log-concave for short) if its domain is a convex set, and if it satisfies the inequality
 
If  is strictly positive, this is equivalent to saying that the logarithm of the function, is concave; that is,
 

Examples of log-concave functions are the 0-1 indicator functions of convex sets (which requires the more flexible definition), and the Gaussian function.

Similarly, a function is log-convex if it satisfies the reverse inequality
 

Properties
 A log-concave function is also quasi-concave. This follows from the fact that the logarithm is monotone implying that the superlevel sets of this function are convex.
 Every concave function that is nonnegative on its domain is log-concave. However, the reverse does not necessarily hold. But  is not concave since the second derivative is positive for || > 1:

 From above two points, concavity  log-concavity  quasiconcavity.
 A twice differentiable, nonnegative function with a convex domain is log-concave if and only if for all  satisfying ,

,

i.e.

 is

negative semi-definite. For functions of one variable, this condition simplifies to

Operations preserving log-concavity

 Products: The product of log-concave functions is also log-concave. Therefore

is concave, and hence also  is log-concave.

 Marginals: if  :  is log-concave, then

is log-concave (see Prékopa–Leindler inequality).

is log-concave.

Log-concave distributions
Log-concave distributions are necessary for a number of algorithms, e.g. adaptive rejection sampling. Every distribution with  log-concave density is a maximum entropy probability distribution with specified mean μ and Deviation risk measure D. 
As it happens, many common probability distributions are log-concave.  Some examples:
The normal distribution and multivariate normal distributions.
The exponential distribution.
The uniform distribution over any convex set.
The logistic distribution.
The extreme value distribution.
The Laplace distribution.
The chi distribution.
The hyperbolic secant distribution.
The Wishart distribution, where n >= p + 1.
The Dirichlet distribution, where all parameters are >= 1.
The gamma distribution if the shape parameter is >= 1.
The chi-square distribution if the number of degrees of freedom is >= 2.
The beta distribution if both shape parameters are >= 1.
The Weibull distribution if the shape parameter is >= 1.

Note that all of the parameter restrictions have the same basic source: The exponent of non-negative quantity must be non-negative in order for the function to be log-concave.

The following distributions are non-log-concave for all parameters:
The Student's t-distribution.
The Cauchy distribution.
The Pareto distribution.
The log-normal distribution.
The F-distribution.

Note that the cumulative distribution function (CDF) of all log-concave distributions is also log-concave.  However, some non-log-concave distributions also have log-concave CDF's:
The log-normal distribution.
The Pareto distribution.
The Weibull distribution when the shape parameter < 1.
The gamma distribution when the shape parameter < 1.

The following are among the properties of log-concave distributions:
If a density is log-concave, so is its cumulative distribution function (CDF).
If a multivariate density is log-concave, so is the marginal density over any subset of variables.
The sum of two independent log-concave random variables is log-concave.  This follows from the fact that the convolution of two log-concave functions is log-concave.
The product of two log-concave functions is log-concave.  This means that joint densities formed by multiplying two probability densities (e.g. the normal-gamma distribution, which always has a shape parameter >= 1) will be log-concave.  This property is heavily used in general-purpose Gibbs sampling programs such as BUGS and JAGS, which are thereby able to use adaptive rejection sampling over a wide variety of conditional distributions derived from the product of other distributions.
 If a density is log-concave, so is its survival function.
 If a density is log-concave, it has a monotone hazard rate (MHR), and is a regular distribution since the derivative of the logarithm of the survival function is the negative hazard rate, and by concavity is monotone i.e.
 which is decreasing as it is the derivative of a concave function.

See also
logarithmically concave sequence
logarithmically concave measure
logarithmically convex function
convex function

Notes

References
 
 

 

 

Mathematical analysis
Convex analysis